The Miles Franklin Literary Award is an annual literary prize awarded to "a novel which is of the highest literary merit and presents Australian life in any of its phases". The award was set up according to the will of Miles Franklin (1879–1954), who is best known for writing the Australian classic My Brilliant Career (1901). She bequeathed her estate to fund this award. As of 2016, the award is valued A$60,000.


Winners

Controversies 
Author Frank Moorhouse was disqualified from consideration for his novel Grand Days because the story was set in Europe during the 1920s and was not sufficiently Australian.

1995 winner Helen Darville, also known as Helen Demidenko and Helen Dale, won for The Hand that signed the Paper and sparked a debate about authenticity in Australian literature. Darville claimed to be of Ukrainian descent and said it was fiction based on family history.  Writer David Marr, who presented the award to her said that revelations about her true background did not  “alter a single thing about the quality of the story, it knocks completely out of the water her answers to critics who said it was not historically accurate, that she knows because of direct family experience, which appears to be complete bull----."

Even before the hoax was revealed, Darville’s book was considered anti-Semitic and justified the genocide of Jewish people.  It was also later revealed that she plagiarised from multiple sources.

In 2004, judges of the award resigned due to what they viewed as the commodification of the awards.

2022 longlisted writer John Hughes was accused of plagiarising significant sections of his 2021 book The Dogs from Nobel Laureate Svetlana Alexievich’s nonfiction book The Unwomanly Face of War. Nearly 60 similarities and identical sentences were found in a comparison of Hughes’ novel and the English version of Alexievich’s book. The Guardian newspaper also found similarities between incidents described in the books, including the central scene from which The Dogs takes its title. Further investigation found other examples of plagiarism in the novel and that Hughes copied sections of classic texts including The Great Gatsby and Anna Karenina without acknowledging the original source. The book was subsequently withdrawn from competition.

The Stella Prize was created in 2013 as a reaction to the underrepresentation of women as winners of literary prizes, in particular the 2011 Miles Franklin Award shortlist.

Repeat winners 

 (4) Thea Astley: 1962, 1965, 1972, 2000
 (4) Tim Winton: 1984, 1992, 2002, 2009
 (3) Peter Carey: 1981, 1989, 1998
 (3) David Ireland: 1971, 1976, 1979
 (2) Jessica Anderson: 1978, 1980
 (2) Rodney Hall: 1982, 1994
 (2) Thomas Keneally: 1967, 1968
 (2) Michelle de Kretser: 2013, 2018
 (2) George Johnston: 1964, 1969
 (2) Christopher Koch: 1985, 1996
 (2) Alex Miller: 1993, 2003
 (2) Kim Scott: 2000, 2011
 (2) Patrick White: 1957, 1961

Shortlisted works

Shortlisted titles are only shown for the years 1987 onwards. No record has yet been found for any shortlists being released prior to that year. Winners are listed in bold type.

1980s
In 1989, the date changed from the year of publication to year of announcement, so no award was named in 1988.

1990s

2000s

2010s

2020s

Longlisted works

Longlisted titles are only shown for the years 2005 onwards.  That was the first year that such a list was released by the judging panel.  The number of works included on the longlist varies from year to year.

2005
Salt Rain, Sarah Armstrong
The Gift of Speed, Steven Carroll
Backwaters, Robert Engwarda
The Ghost Writer, John Harwood
The Broken Book, Susan Johnson
Sixty Lights, Gail Jones
A Private Man, Malcolm Knox
The Philosopher's Doll, Amanda Lohrey
The White Earth, Andrew McGahan
I Have Kissed Your Lips, Gerard Windsor
The Submerged Cathedral, Charlotte Wood
The Last Ride, Denise Young

2006
Knitting, Anne Bartlett
The Garden Book, Brian Castro
The Secret River, Kate Grenville
An Accidental Tourist, Stephen Lang
The Ballad of Desmond Kale, Roger McDonald
Prochownik's Dream, Alex Miller
Sunnyside, Joanna Murray-Smith
A Case of Knives, Peter Rose
The Broken Shore, Peter Temple
Everyman's Rules for Scientific Living, Carrie Tiffany
Dead Europe, Christos Tsiolkas
The Wing of Night, Brenda Walker

2007
Theft: A Love Story, Peter Carey
Silent Parts, John Charalambous
The Unknown Terrorist, Richard Flanagan
Beyond the Break, Sandra Hall
Dreams of Speaking, Gail Jones
The Unexpected Elements of Love, Kate Legge
Careless, Deborah Robertson
Carpentaria, Alexis Wright

2008
The Fern Tattoo, David Brooks
The Time We Have Taken, Steven Carroll
Love Without Hope, Rodney Hall
Orpheus Lost, Janette Turner Hospital
Sorry, Gail Jones
The Widow and Her Hero, Thomas Keneally
The Memory Room, Christopher Koch
Landscape of Farewell, Alex Miller
Secrets of the Sea, Nicholas Shakespeare

2009
The Pages, Murray Bail
Wanting, Richard Flanagan
Addition, Toni Jordan
One Foot Wrong, Sofie Laguna
Ice, Louis Nowra
Fugitive Blue, Claire Thomas
A Fraction of the Whole, Steve Toltz
The Devil's Eye, Ian Townsend
The Slap, Christos Tsiolkas
Breath, Tim Winton

2010
Figurehead, Patrick Allington
Parrot and Olivier in America, Peter Carey
The Bath Fugues, Brian Castro
Boy on a Wire, Jon Doust
The Book of Emmett, Deborah Forster
Sons of the Rumour, David Foster
Siddon Rock, Glenda Guest
Butterfly, Sonya Hartnett
The People's Train, Thomas Keneally
Lovesong, Alex Miller
Jasper Jones, Craig Silvey
Truth, Peter Temple

2011
Rocks in the Belly, John Bauer
The Good Daughter, Honey Brown
The Mary Smokes Boys, Patrick Holland
The Piper's Son, Melina Marchetta
When Colts Ran, Roger McDonald
Time's Long Ruin, Stephen Orr
That Deadman Dance, Kim Scott
The Legacy, Kirsten Tranter
Bereft, Chris Womersley

2012
Blood, Tony Birch
Spirit of Progress, Steven Carroll
Spirit House, Mark Dapin
The Precipice, Virginia Duigan
All That I Am, Anna Funder
Sarah Thornhill, Kate Grenville
Five Bells, Gail Jones
Foal's Bread, Gillian Mears
Autumn Laing, Alex Miller
Cold Light, Frank Moorhouse
Past the Shallows, Favel Parrett
The Street Sweeper, Elliot Perlman
Animal People, Charlotte Wood

2013
Floundering, Romy Ash 
Lola Bensky, Lily Brett 
Street to Street, Brian Castro 
Questions of Travel, Michelle de Kretser 
The Beloved, Annah Faulkner 
The Daughters of Mars, Thomas Keneally 
The Mountain, Drusilla Modjeska 
The Light Between Oceans, M.L. Stedman 
Mateship with Birds, Carrie Tiffany 
Red Dirt Talking, Jacqueline Wright

2014
The Life and Loves of Lena Gaunt, Tracy Farr 
The Narrow Road to the Deep North, Richard Flanagan
The Railwayman's Wife, Ashley Hay
Mullumbimby, Melissa Lucashenko
The Night Guest, Fiona McFarlane
Belomor, Nicolas Rothwell
Game, Trevor Shearston
My Beautiful Enemy, Cory Taylor
Eyrie, Tim Winton
The Swan Book, Alexis Wright
All the Birds, Singing, Evie Wyld

2015
In Certain Circles, Elizabeth Harrower 
Golden Boys, Sonya Hartnett
The Eye of the Sheep, Sofie Laguna
The Golden Age, Joan London
The Lost Child, Suzanne McCourt
Here Come the Dogs, Omar Musa
When the Night Comes, Favel Parrett
After Darkness, Christine Piper
Tree Palace, Craig Sherborne
Nest, Inga Simpson

2016
 Ghost River, Tony Birch 
 Coming Rain, Stephen Daisley
 Hope Farm, Peggy Frew
 Leap, Myfanwy Jones
 The World Without Us, Mireille Juchau
 The Hands : An Australian Pastoral, Stephen Orr
 Black Rock White City, A. S. Patrić
 Salt Creek, Lucy Treloar
 The Natural Way of Things, Charlotte Wood

2017
The Easy Way Out, Steven Amsterdam
An Isolated Incident, Emily Maguire
The Last Days of Ava Langdon, Mark O'Flynn
Their Brilliant Careers, Ryan O'Neill
A Loving, Faithful Animal, Josephine Rowe
Waiting, Philip Salom
Where The Trees Are, Inga Simpson
Hold, Kirsten Tranter
Extinctions, Josephine Wilson

2018
A Long Way from Home, Peter Carey (Penguin Random House)
No More Boats, Felicity Castagna (Giramondo Publishing)
The Life to Come, Michelle de Kretser (Allen & Unwin)
The Crying Place, Lia Hills (Allen & Unwin)
The Last Garden, Eva Hornung (Text Publishing)
Some Tests, Wayne Macauley (Text Publishing)
Storyland, Catherine McKinnon (HarperCollins Publishers)
Border Districts, Gerald Murnane (Giramondo Publishing)
From the Wreck, Jane Rawson (Transit Lounge)
The Restorer, Michael Sala (Text Publishing)
Taboo, Kim Scott (Picador Australia/Pan Macmillan Australia)

2019
 The Lebs, Michael Mohammed Ahmad (Hachette)
 Flames, Robbie Arnott (Text Publishing)
 Boy Swallows Universe, Trent Dalton (Fourth Estate)
 A Sand Archive, Gregory Day (Picador)
 Inappropriation, Lexi Freiman (Allen & Unwin)
 A Stolen Season, Rodney Hall (Picador)
 The Death of Noah Glass, Gail Jones (Text Publishing)
 Too Much Lip, Melissa Lucashenko (UQP)
 Dyschronia, Jennifer Mills (Picador)
 The Lucky Galah, Tracy Sorensen (Picador)

2020

 The White Girl, Tony Birch (UQP)
 Room For a Stranger, Melanie Cheng (Text Publishing)
 Islands, Peggy Frew (Allen & Unwin)
 No One, John Hughes (UWA Publishing)
 Act of Grace, Anna Krien (Black Inc.)
 A Season on Earth, Gerald Murnane (Text Publishing)
 The Returns, Philip Salom (Transit Lounge)
 Exploded View, Carrie Tiffany (Text Publishing)
 The Yield, Tara June Winch (Hamish Hamilton)
 The Weekend, Charlotte Wood (Allen & Unwin)
2021

 Amnesty, Aravind Adiga (Picador)
 The Rain Heron, Robbie Arnott (Text Publishing)
 At the Edge of the Solid World, Daniel Davis Wood (Brio)
 Our Shadows, Gail Jones (Text Publishing)
 Infinite Splendours, Sofie Laguna (Allen & Unwin)
 The Labyrinth, Amanda Lohrey (Text Publishing)
 The Animals in That Country, Laura Jean McKay (Scribe)
 Lucky’s, Andrew Pippos (Picador)
 Stone Sky, Gold Mountain, Mirandi Riwoe (UQP)
 The Fifth Season, Philip Salom (Transit Lounge)
 Song of the Crocodile, Nardi Simpson (Hachette)
 The Inland Sea, Madeleine Watts (Pushkin Press)
2022

 The Other Half of You, Michael Mohammed Ahmad (Hachette)
 After Story, Larissa Behrendt (UQP)
 Scary Monsters, Michelle de Kretser (Allen & Unwin)
 Bodies of Light, Jennifer Down (Text Publishing)
 Echolalia, Briohny Doyle (Vintage)
 The Magpie Wing, Max Easton (Giramondo Publishing)
 The Airways, Jennifer Mills (Picador)
 One Hundred Days, Alice Pung (Black Inc.)
 The Performance, Claire Thomas (Hachette)
 7 ½, Christos Tsiolkas (Allen & Unwin)
 Grimmish, Michael Winkler (Puncher & Wattmann)

See also
 Australian History Awards
 Australian literature
 Culture of Australia
 The Commonwealth Writers Prize
 List of Australian literary awards
 List of literary awards
 National Biography Award
 New South Wales Premier's History Awards
 Prime Minister's Literary Awards

References

Further reading

External links

 
Awards established in 1957
1957 establishments in Australia
Australian fiction awards